Saint Anne's Park is a  public park situated between Raheny and Clontarf, suburbs on the northside of Dublin, Ireland. It is owned and managed by Dublin City Council.

The park, the second largest municipal park in Dublin, is part of a former  estate assembled by members of the Guinness family, descendants of Sir Arthur Guinness, founder of the famous brewery, beginning with Benjamin Lee Guinness in 1835 (the largest municipal park is nearby (North) Bull Island, also shared between Clontarf and Raheny).  In 1837, they built St Anne's House, a large Italianate-style residence.  The house and park were purchased by Dublin Corporation (now Dublin City Council) in 1939.  Part of the land was developed for housing.

The park is bisected by the small Naniken River and features an artificial pond and a number of follies, a rose garden, a Chinese garden, a fine collection of trees with walks, including an arboretum, a playground, cafe, and recreational facilities including extensive GAA and soccer playing fields, tennis courts and a par-3 golf course.

History

The estate was named after the Holy Well of the same name.  Lands were purchased over time by the Guinness family to build up an extensive property.  In 1837, Elizabeth and Benjamin Lee Guinness commissioned St Anne's House, a large Italianate-style residence known locally as “The Mansion”, and it was modified over several generations.  The Italianate influence included references in the garden follies to ancient Roman sites and the import of actual antiquities.

In 1868 Elizabeth and Benjamin's son, Sir Arthur Edward Guinness (Lord Ardilaun), inherited the estate and also purchased Manresa House next door.  He was the person most responsible for expanding and developing the estate and gardens and planted wind-breaking evergreen oak trees  (Quercus ilex) and pines along the main avenue and estate boundaries, where they remain. Lady Ardilaun, originally of Bantry House, County Cork, developed the gardens based on her interest in French chateau gardens, but also with eclectic influences of the Victorian era and the horticultural expertise of her Scottish gardener. Lord Ardilaun was also prominent in the Royal Horticultural Society.

Lord and Lady Ardilaun had no children and the estate passed to their nephew Bishop Benjamin in the 1920s. Bishop Plunkett retained Sybil Hill as a private residence with 30 acres (120,000 m²) of parkland, and it was later sold to the later became the site of St Paul's College, Raheny. In 1952 St. Paul's College acquired an additional 14 acres of Corporation lands, behind their school, to use as school playing fields. During the Second World War, Dublin Corporation encouraged local residents to grow vegetables in allotment gardens in the estate.

In December 1943, the main residence of St Anne's was gutted by a fire while being used as a store by the Local Defence Force; the ruins were demolished in 1968.

Features

The park has a number of features.  It is crossed by the small Naniken River, and this, in turn, feeds the artificial Duck Pond.  The Guinness family added a number of follies, a walled garden, and the grand avenue. Over the last fifty years, extensive walks, a famous Rose Garden and newer miniature rose garden, and Dublin's city arboretum, the Millennium Arboretum, with 1,000 varied trees, have been added.

Within the last decade, Dublin City Council has been restoring parts of the Naniken River to its natural state, creating wildlife habitats and wildflower meadows, and improving the path system.  They removed some 1970s interventions, including a secondary pond and some rockery walks, partly due to problems with maintenance and partly to open up a vista from the James Larkin Road.  The park management also increased car parking to alleviate traffic congestion in the surrounding neighbourhoods of the popular park.

Follies
St. Annes is known for its follies, of which there are approximately ten, mainly around the Naniken River. The follies include a Herculanean Temple on a mock-ruined bridge abutment along the little river, which served as a tearoom for the family, a Pompeian Water Temple of Isis on the banks of the duck pond, and the Annie Lee Tower and Bridge near the chestnut walk. Other follies include the stone covering of Saint Anne's Well beside the duck pond, the Hermitage Bridge, the Yew Circle and Fountain Pool (behind the formal walled garden beside the house), a "rustic cave" and bridge, three rustic archways and a rockwork feature. A "Druidic Circle" of Giant's Causeway basalt was lost at an earlier stage. An unusual folly is the Roman style viewing tower which stands on the hill overlooking the duck pond. This started out as an observation tower on the roof of the original house. Later, the tower was removed during the extensive refurbishment of St. Annes' house in about 1873 and placed in its current location. It is modelled on the Tomb of the Julii at Glanum near St. Rémy in France.

Many of the follies had reached a neglected condition.  For example, the Roman style viewing tower was graffiti-covered, had been closed for many years and became completely hidden by mature trees (it could only be revealed, and the view restored, by felling trees, which would be detrimental to the environment of the park, so an alternative proposal was that the tower be moved instead to the site of the old rockery, near the junction of James Larkin Road and Mount Prospect Avenue). In 2010, Dublin City Council, with the support of the Heritage Council, commissioned a strategy by conservation architects (Shaffrey and Associates) for the long-term conservation of these follies, and it was planned to implement this on a phased basis.  Restoration works began in 2017.  Graffiti remains an ongoing issue.

Buildings

The elaborate Tudor red brick Ardilaun stables were designed by George Coppinger Ashlin, also the architect of All Saints Church at Raheny.  The Red Stables as they are called, were renovated in the 1990s by Dublin City Council as the Red Stables Art Centre, with public facilities such as artists' residences upstairs, an exhibition space and a café, Olive's Room. Previous artists-in-residence include Niall de Buitléar, Tadhg McSweeney, and Paul McKinley. A Farmers' Market is held in the courtyard at weekends. This scheme has won international architecture awards.

Gardens

The Rose Garden
In 1975, St Anne's Rose Garden was opened to the public. In 1980 it was given a Civic Award by Bord Failte and the Irish Town Planning Institute, and since 1981 it has been a centre for International Rose Trials.  Its development led to the annual Rose Festival, now a popular event on the summer calendar for Dublin gardeners and families every July.

Walled garden complex
The walled garden, including a fruit garden added to the estate by Bishop Plunkett, holds a  plant nursery for the Parks Department. Thousands of bedding plants, shrubs, trees, and floral tubs are produced annually in the nursery. 

There is a herbaceous garden area open during limited hours, and a fine clock tower, restored to working order in 2007.  There is also a Physic or Herb Garden, and a miniature rose garden.

A Chinese garden, in the Suzhou style, was built in one corner of the walled garden.

Former walled garden
The walled garden next to the house also contained many features, of which few traces remain. The garden was entered through a claire-voie screen of bronze, painted yew green and elaborately gilded. The centre walk of the garden consisted of a castellated yew hedge with marble statuary along its length. The walk terminated in a nymphaeum, flanked by obelisks of yew and featuring a sculpted group of Jupiter and Thetis. Also in the walled house garden was an aviary with golden pheasants; a floral temple of arches and chains in cast iron; and a circular yew hedge with allegorical marble Italian statues representing the five continents, which were reflected in a great circular marble basin in the centre. The Georgian door-case of the original house Thornhill was also erected as an entrance of a French lavender garden.

Allotments
Since 2009, Dublin City Council has provided public allotment gardens (allocated on a lottery basis) to meet demand by city residents for space to grow their own produce.

Leisure facilities

The park is intensively used by the public through its 35 playing pitches, 18 hard-surfaced tennis courts (some managed by Raheny Tennis Club), and a par-3 golf course (Andrew McMorrow is the current course record holder with 16 under par set 1 July 2019). Woodland paths provide for walkers and joggers.

There is a weekly free 5 km parkrun on Saturday mornings at 9:30 in the park.

There is an all-weather cricket crease in the middle of the main playing fields, and one pitch is floodlit for Gaelic Games. North Dublin Softball Club also use the park for training. There are 4 Boules (pétanque) courts and a model car racing track.

Fauna
Mammals present in the park include badgers, hedgehogs, rabbits, fox, grey squirrels, house mice, field mice, pipistrelle bats and brown rats. Birds include sparrow hawk, woodcock and jay.  The park has a greater than average diversity of bee species and is also notable for many species of butterflies.

Squirrels

Red squirrels were formerly numerous in the park, which was one of the last strongholds of the species in Dublin. Grey squirrels were first noticed at the Sybil Hill end of the park in 1998. The grey squirrels have since spread throughout the park and numbers of reds have been drastically reduced. A programme to reduce grey squirrels was carried out by Dublin City Council and University College Dublin, but the remaining red squirrel population was not reproducing and has crashed, for reasons uncertain.  It is hoped that a re-introduction programme will be possible in future.

Flora
The park has a range of vegetation habitats and many historic trees.  The plant collections are of national importance.  There are also protected native plants and species of botanical interest. These are surveyed and managed by Dublin City Council Parks and Landscape Services Division.

References

Raheny
Clontarf, Dublin
Folly buildings in the Republic of Ireland
Parks in Dublin (city)
Rose gardens